St John's educational trust is a registered Trust for educational and charitable purposes. Saint John's Educational Trust is funding and running seven educational institutions of which three are affiliated to the Central Board of Secondary Education, New Delhi and four are affiliated to the State Education Department, Government of Tamil Nadu.

Institutions managed by St John's educational trust 

 St. John's Senior Secondary School, CBSE since 1968 Mandaveli, Chennai - 600 028
 St. John's Matriculation Higher Secondary School Alwarthirunagar, Chennai, since 1974 - 600087.
 St. John's English School & Junior College, CBSE since 1981 Besant Nagar, Chennai - 600 090
 St. John's Matriculation Higher Secondary School, since 1983 Baba Nagar, Chennai - 600 049
 St. John's International Residential School, CBSE since 1993 Poonamallee, Chennai - 602 103
 St. John's Matriculation Higher Secondary School, since 1997 Mandaveli, Chennai - 600 028
 St. John's Village School, since 2000 Poonamallee, Chennai - 602 103
 St. John's Academy Matriculation Higher Secondary School, since 2002 Poonamallee, Chennai - 602 103

References

High schools and secondary schools in Chennai